Boli me uvo za sve (I Don't Care About Anything) is the ninth studio album by Yugoslavian pop-folk singer Lepa Brena and her band Slatki Greh. It was released 23 October 1990 through the record label Diskoton.

The music video for Tamba Lamba was filmed in Kenya in August 1990. This was her tenth of twelve albums with Slatki Greh.

This album was sold in a circulation of 450,000 copies.

Track listing

Personnel

Crew
Nedim Bačvić – design
Aleksandar Cvetinovski – photography
Dragutin Savić – photography

References

1990 albums
Lepa Brena albums
Diskoton albums
Serbo-Croatian language albums